The Sun Rising may refer to:

The Sun Rising (poem), a poem by John Donne published in 1633
"The Sun Rising" (song), a 1989 single by The Beloved

See also
 Sunrise (disambiguation)